The Viceroyalty of Peru officially known as the Kingdom of Peru was a Spanish imperial provincial administrative district, created in 1542, that originally contained modern-day Peru and most of the Spanish Empire in South America, governed from the capital of Lima. Peru was one of the two Spanish Viceroyalties in the Americas from the sixteenth to the eighteenth centuries.

The Spanish did not resist the Portuguese expansion of Brazil across the meridian established by the Treaty of Tordesillas. The treaty was rendered meaningless between 1580 and 1640 while Spain controlled Portugal. The creation during the 18th century of Viceroyalties of New Granada and Río de la Plata (at the expense of Peru's territory) reduced the importance of Lima and shifted the lucrative Andean trade to Buenos Aires, while the fall of the mining and textile production accelerated the progressive decay of the Viceroyalty of Peru. Eventually, the viceroyalty would dissolve, as with much of the Spanish Empire, when challenged by national independence movements at the beginning of the nineteenth century. These movements led to the formation of the modern-day country of Peru, as well as Chile, Colombia, Panama, Ecuador, Bolivia, Paraguay, Uruguay, and Argentina, the territories that at one point or another had constituted the Viceroyalty of Peru.

History

Conquest of Peru

After the Spanish conquest of Peru, Charles V granted the conquistadors with adelantados, gave them the right to become governors and justices of the region they conquered. Prior to the establishment of the Viceroyalty of Peru, several major governorates formed from these grants, including the Governorate of New Castile (1529), Governorate of New Toledo (1534), Governorate of New Andalusia (1534), and Province of Tierra Firme (1539).

Exploration and settlement (1542–1643) 

In 1542, the Spanish organized the existing governorates into the Viceroyalty of New Castile, which shortly afterward would be called the Viceroyalty of Peru, in order to properly control and govern the Spanish South America.

In 1544, Holy Roman Emperor Charles V (King Charles I of Spain) named Blasco Núñez Vela Peru's first viceroy. From September 2, 1564, to November 26, 1569, Lope García de Castro, a Spanish colonial administrator who constituted the first Audiencia in Spanish South America, served as the interim viceroy of Peru.

Although established, the viceroyalty was not properly organized until the arrival of Viceroy Francisco Álvarez de Toledo, who made an extensive tour of inspection of the region. Francisco de Toledo, "one of the great administrators of human times", established the Inquisition in the viceroyalty and promulgated laws that applied to Indians and Spanish alike, breaking the power of the encomenderos and reducing the old system of mita (the Incan system of mandatory labor tribute). He improved the defensibility of the viceroyalty with fortifications, bridges, and la Armada del Mar del Sur (the Southern Fleet) against pirates. He ended the indigenous Neo-Inca State in Vilcabamba, executing the Inca Túpac Amaru, and promoted economic development from the commercial monopoly and mineral extraction, mainly from silver mines in Potosí.

The Amazon Basin and some large adjoining regions had been considered Spanish territory since the Treaty of Tordesillas and explorations such as that by Francisco de Orellana, but Portugal fell under Spanish control between 1580 and 1640. During this time, Portuguese territories in Brazil were controlled by the Spanish crown, which did  object to the spread of Portuguese settlement into parts of the Amazon Basin that the treaty had awarded to Spain. Still, Luis Jerónimo de Cabrera, 4th Count of Chinchón sent out a third expedition to explore the Amazon River, under Cristóbal de Acuña; this was part of the return leg of the expedition of Pedro Teixeira.

Some Pacific islands and archipelagoes were visited by Spanish ships in the sixteenth century, but they made no effort to trade with or colonize them. These included New Guinea (by Ýñigo Ortiz de Retez in 1545), the Solomon Islands (in 1568), and the Marquesas Islands (in 1595) by Álvaro de Mendaña de Neira.

The first Jesuit reduction to Christianize the indigenous population was founded in 1609, but some areas occupied by Brazilians as bandeirantes gradually extended their activities through much of the basin and adjoining Mato Grosso in the 17th and 18th centuries. These groups had the advantage of remote geography and river access from the mouth of the Amazon, which was in Portuguese territory. Meanwhile, the Spanish were barred by their laws from enslaving indigenous people, leaving them without a commercial interest deep in the interior of the basin.

A famous attack upon a Spanish mission in 1628 resulted in the enslavement of 60,000 indigenous people. In fact, as time passed, they were used as a self-funding occupation force by the Portuguese authorities in what was effectively a low-level war of territorial conquest.

In 1617, viceroy Francisco de Borja y Aragón divided the government of Río de la Plata in two, Buenos Aires and Paraguay, both dependencies of the Viceroyalty of Peru. He established the Tribunal del Consulado, a court and administrative body for commercial affairs in the viceroyalty. Diego Fernández de Córdoba, Marquis of Guadalcázar, reformed the fiscal system and stopped the interfamily rivalry that was bloodying the domain.

Other viceroys, such as Fernando Torres, Fernández de Cabrera, and Fernández Córdoba expanded the royal navy and fortified the ports to resist foreign incursions, such as those led by privateer Thomas Cavendish. Fernández de Cabrera also suppressed an insurrection of the Uru and Mapuche Indians.

The last Spanish Habsburgs (1643–1713) 

Viceroys had to protect the Pacific coast from French contraband and English and Dutch pirates and privateers. They expanded the naval forces, fortified the ports of Valdivia, Valparaíso, Arica and Callao and constructed city walls in Lima (1686) and Trujillo (1685–1687). Nevertheless, the famous Welsh privateer Henry Morgan took Chagres and captured and sacked the city of Panama in the early part of 1670. Also Peruvian forces repelled the attacks by Edward David (1684 and 1686), Charles Wager and Thomas Colb (1708). The Peace of Utrecht allowed the British to send ships and merchandise to the fair at Portobello.

In this period, revolts were common. Around 1656, Pedro Bohórquez crowned himself Inca (emperor) of the Calchaquí Indians, inciting the indigenous population to revolt. From 1665 until 1668, the rich mineowners José and Gaspar Salcedo revolted against the colonial government. The clergy were opposed to the nomination of prelates from Spain. Viceroy Diego Ladrón de Guevara had to take measures against an uprising of slaves at the hacienda of Huachipa de Lima. There were terrible earthquakes (1655, 1687) and epidemics, too.

During Baltasar de la Cueva Enríquez's administration, the laws of the Indies were compiled. Diego de Benavides y de la Cueva issued the Ordenanza de Obrajes (Ordenance of Manufactures) in 1664 and Pedro Álvarez de Toledo y Leiva introduced the papel sellado (literally, sealed paper). In 1683 Melchor de Navarra y Rocafull reestablished the Lima mint, which had been closed since 1572. Viceroy Diego Ladrón de Guevara increased the production of silver in the mines of Potosí, and stimulated production in other mines at San Nicolás, Cajatambo and Huancavelica. He limited the manufacture of aguardiente from sugar cane to authorized factories, which he taxed heavily.

The Churches of Los Desamparados (1672), La Buena Muerte and the convent of Mínimos de San Francisco de Paula were finished and opened. The Hospital of Espiritu Santo in Lima and San Bartolomé hospital were built.

The Bourbon Reforms (1713–1806)

In 1717 the Viceroyalty of New Granada was created from the northern territories, the Audiencias of Bogotá, Quito and Panamá. This viceroyalty initially lasted only until 1724, but was reestablished permanently in 1740. With the creation of the Viceroyalty of the Río de la Plata from southern areas that are now Argentina, Bolivia, Paraguay and Uruguay in 1776, the Charcas and Buenos Aires audiencias were similarly lost. The 256-year-old Treaty of Tordesillas was superseded by the 1750 Treaty of Madrid which granted Portugal control of the lands it had occupied in South America in the intervening centuries. This Portuguese occupation led to the Guaraní War of 1756. Amazonas is named after the Amazon River, and was formerly part of the Spanish Viceroyalty of Peru, a region called Spanish Guyana. It was settled by the Portuguese in the early 18th century and incorporated into the Portuguese empire after the Treaty of Madrid in 1750. It became a state of the Brazilian Republic in 1889.

Several viceroys had scientific, political and economic impact on the Viceroyalty.  Manuel de Amat y Juniet organized an expedition to Tahiti. Viceroy Teodoro de Croix also decentralized the government through the creation of eight intendencias in the area of the Audiencia of Lima, and two in the Captaincy General of Chile. Francisco Gil de Taboada reincorporated the region of Puno into the Viceroyalty of Peru. José de Armendáriz stimulated the production of silver and took steps against fraud, corruption and smuggling. Amat y Juniet established the first Regulation of Commerce and Organization of Customs rules, which led to the building of the customshouse in Callao. Teodoro de Croix collaborated in the creation of the Junta Superior de Comercio and the Tribunal de Minería (1786).

An earthquake demolished Lima and Callao, in 1746. Viceroy Amat y Juniet constructed various public works in Lima, including the first bull ring. Manuel de Guirior also improved the medical care at ten hospitals in Lima and established a foundling home.

War between Spain and Britain again broke out (the War of Jenkins' Ear, 1739–1748). Amat y Juniet constructed the fortress of Real Felipe in Callao in 1774.

Nevertheless, throughout this period, rebellions by Native Peruvians were not entirely suppressed. In the eighteenth century alone, there were fourteen large uprisings, the most important of which were that of Juan Santos Atahualpa in 1742, and the Sierra Uprising of Túpac Amaru II in 1780. The Comunero Revolt broke out in Paraguay from 1721 to 1732). In 1767, the Jesuits were expelled from the colony.

End of the Viceroyalty (1806–24)

Viceroy José Fernando de Abascal y Sousa promoted educational reforms, reorganized the army, and stamped out local rebellions. During his administration, the Inquisition of Lima was temporarily abolished as a result of the reforms taken by the Cortes in Spain.

When the wars of independence broke out in 1810, Peru was the center of Royalist reaction. Abascal reincorporated the provinces of Córdoba, Potosí, La Paz, Charcas, Rancagua and Quito into the Viceroyalty of Peru. The Royal Army of Perú during 14 years defeated the patriots armies of Argentinians and Chileans, turning Peru into the last royal bastion in South America.

A large fire in Guayaquil destroyed approximately half of the city in 1812.

Lord Cochrane, unsuccessfully attacked Guayaquil and El Callao, but on 4 February he captured Valdivia, called at the time The Key of the South Seas and the Gibraltar of the Pacific, due to its huge fortifications. However the viceroyalty managed to defend Chiloé Island until 1826.

On September 8, 1820, the Expedición Libertadora of Peru, organized mainly by Argentinians and with some Peruvian and Chilean's government involvement, landed on the beach at Paracas Bay, near the city of Pisco. The land army was under the command of José de San Martín. after the navy under Thomas Cochrane defeated the navy of the Spanish empire on the Peruvian coasts and have control and surrender of Callao, After fruitless negotiations with the viceroy, the expedition occupied the Peruvian capital of Lima on July 21, 1821. The independence of Peru was proclaimed on July 28, 1821. Viceroy José de la Serna e Hinojosa, still in command of a sizable military force, retired to Jauja, and later to Cusco.

On July 26, 1822, San Martín and Simón Bolívar met in Guayaquil to define a strategy for the liberation of the rest of Peru. The meeting was secret, and exactly what occurred is not known. However, afterwards San Martín returned to Argentina while Bolívar prepared to launch an offensive against the remaining royalist forces in Peru and Upper Peru (modern-day Bolivia). In September 1823 Bolívar arrived in Lima with Antonio José de Sucre to plan the offensive.

In February 1824 the royalists briefly regained control of Lima. Olañeta's Rebellion started by surprise and the entire royalist army of Upper Peru (today's Bolivia) revolted, led by Pedro Antonio Olañeta (royalist) against La Serna, the viceroy of Peru (a liberal). This broke the royal army and started a civil war in Upper Peru. Having regrouped in Trujillo, Bolívar in June led his rebel forces south to confront the Spanish under Field Marshal José de Canterac. The two armies met on the plains of Junín on August 6, 1824, and the Peruvians were victorious in a battle fought entirely without firearms. The Spanish troops subsequently evacuated Lima for a second time.

As a result of a decree of the Congress of Gran Colombia, Bolívar turned over command of the rebel troops to Sucre on October 7, 1824.

Royalist control was now reduced to Cuzco in the south-central highlands. The viceroy launched a counter-offensive over Ayacucho. It was there that the final battle for the independence of Peru would be fought.

On 9 December 1824, the Battle of Ayacucho, or Battle of La Quinua, took place at Pampa de La Quinua, a few kilometers away from Ayacucho, near the town of Quinua. This battle — between royalist (Spanish) and nationalist (republican) troops — sealed the independence of Peru and South America. The victorious nationalist forces were led by Antonio José de Sucre, Bolívar's lieutenant. Viceroy Serna was wounded and taken prisoner. The Spanish army had 2,000 dead and wounded and lost 3,000 prisoners, with the remainder of the army entirely dispersed. After the battle, Serna signed the final capitulation whereby the Spaniards agreed to leave Peru. Serna was released soon afterwards and sailed for Europe.

Spain made futile attempts to retain its former territories, such as at the Siege of Callao (1826), but after death of King Ferdinand VII of Spain, in 1836 government of Spain renounced its territorial and sovereignty claims over all of continental America.  In 1867 Spain signed a peace treaty with Peru and in 1879 it signed a treaty recognizing Peru's independence.

Politics 

The town of Lima, founded by Pizarro on January 18, 1535, as the "Ciudad de los Reyes" (City of the Kings/Magi), became the seat of the new viceroyalty. As the seat of a viceroy, who had oversight over all of Spanish South America except for Portuguese-dominated Brazil, Lima grew into a powerful city. During the 16th, 17th and most of the 18th centuries, all of the colonial wealth of South America created by the silver mines passed through Lima on its way to the Isthmus of Panama and from there to Seville, Spain. The rest of the viceroyalty dependent upon Lima in administrative matters, in a pattern that persists until today in Peru. By the start of the 18th century, Lima had become a distinguished and aristocratic colonial capital, seat of the 250-year-old Royal and Pontifical University of San Marcos and the chief Spanish stronghold in the Americas.

At ground level during the first century, Spanish encomenderos depended on local chieftains (curacas) to gain access to the Indian population's tribute labor, even the most remote settlements, and therefore, many encomenderos developed reciprocal, if still hierarchical, relationships with the curacas. By the end of the 16th century the quasi-private encomienda had been replaced by the repartimiento system (known in Peru by the Quechua term, mita), which was controlled by local crown officials.

Politically the viceroyalty was further divided into audiencias, which were primarily superior tribunals, but which also had administrative and legislative functions. Each of these was responsible to the Viceroy of Peru in administrative matters (though not in judicial ones). Audiencias further incorporated the older, smaller divisions known as "governorships" (gobernaciones, roughly provinces) headed by a governor. (See, Adelantado.) Provinces which were under military threat were grouped into captaincies general, such as the Captaincy General of Chile (established in 1541 and established as a Bourbon captaincy general in 1789), and which were joint military and political commands with a certain level of autonomy. (The viceroy was captain-general of the provinces which remained directly under his command).

At the local level there were hundreds of districts, in both Indian and Spanish areas, which were headed by either a corregidor (also known as an alcalde mayor) or a cabildo (town council), both of which had judicial and administrative powers. In the late 18th century the Bourbon dynasty began phasing out the corregidores and introduced intendants, whose broad fiscal powers cut into the authority of the viceroys, governors and cabildos. (See Bourbon Reforms.)

Audiencias 
With dates of creation:

Panamá (1st one, 1538–43), (2nd one, 1564–1751)*
Santa Fe de Bogotá (1548)*
Quito (1563)*
Lima (1543)
La Plata de los Charcas (1559)†
Chile (1563–73; 1606)
Later Audiencias
 Buenos Aires (1661–72; 1776)†
 Cuzco (1787)

*Later part of the Viceroyalty of New Granada
†Later part of the Viceroyalty of the Río de la Plata

Autonomous Captaincy General
1.    Chile (1789)

Intendancies
Listed under year of creation:

1783
1. Lima, 2. Puno

1784
3. Trujillo, 4. Tarma, 5. Huancavelica, 6. Cusco, 7. Arequipa, (10. Chiloé, abolished in 1789)

1786
8. Santiago, 9. Concepción

Economy 

The economy of the viceroyalty of Peru largely depended on the export of silver. The huge amounts of silver exported from the viceroyalty of Peru and Mexico deeply affected Europe, where some scholars believe it caused the so-called price revolution. Silver mining was carried out using contract and free wage labourers, as well as the mita system of unfree labour, a system inherited from pre-Hispanic times. Silver production peaked in 1610.

Once the Viceroyalty of Peru was established, gold and silver from the Andes enriched the conquerors, and the viceroyalty became the principal source of Spanish wealth and power in South America. The first coins minted for Peru (and indeed for South America) appeared between 1568 and 1570. Viceroy Manuel de Oms y de Santa Pau sent back an enormous sum of money (1,600,000 pesos) to the king to cover some of the costs of the War of the Spanish Succession. This was possible in part because of the discovery of the mines in Caraboya. Silver from mines at Potosí, Bolivia, circulated around the world. Peruvian and other New World silver was so plentiful that it caused inflation in Spain and a collapse in its price. Even today, Peru and Bolivia produce much of the world's silver.

While most of silver from the viceroyalty ended up in Europe some circulated within South America. Indeed, the Real Situado was an annual payment of silver from the viceroyalty to finance the permanent Spanish army in Chile that which fought a prolongued conflict known as Arauco War. The Spanish in turn traded part of this silver with Mapuches giving origin to a tradition of Mapuche silverwork.

Another issue that burdened the finances of the viceroyalty was the maintenance of the Valdivian Fort System built in response to the Dutch expedition to Valdivia in 1643.

Luis Jerónimo Fernández de Cabrera prohibited direct trade between Peru and New Spain (Mexico) and the persecution of Portuguese Jews, the principal traders in Lima.

Demographics 

A census taken by the last Quipucamayoc indicated that there were 12 million inhabitants of Inca Peru; 45 years later, under viceroy Toledo, the census figures amounted to only 1,100,000 Indians. While the attrition was not an organized attempt at genocide, the results were similar, largely resulting from smallpox and other Eurasian diseases to which the natives had no immunity. Inca cities were given Spanish Christian names and rebuilt as Spanish towns, each centered around a plaza with a church or cathedral facing an official residence. A few Inca cities like Cuzco retained native masonry for the foundations of their walls. Other Inca sites, like Huanuco Viejo, were abandoned for cities at lower altitudes more hospitable to the Spanish.

Viceroy José de Armendáriz reestablished the system whereby Inca nobles who could prove their ancestry were recognized as hijosdalgos of Castile. This led to a frenzy on the part of the Indigenous nobility to legitimate their status.

In the 1790s Viceroy Francisco Gil de Taboada ordered the first official census of the population.

The last cargo of black slaves in Peru was landed in 1806. At that time an adult male slave sold for 600 pesos.

Culture 

Viceroy Francisco de Borja y Aragón reorganized the University of San Marcos and Luis Jerónimo Fernández de Cabrera founded two chairs of medicine. In the 1710s, Viceroy Diego Ladrón de Guevara established a chair of anatomy. Teodoro de Croix and Francisco Gil de Taboada founded anatomy centers. In 1810 the medical school of San Fernando was founded.

On the death of the Peruvian astronomer Doctor Francisco Ruiz Lozano, Viceroy Melchor Liñán y Cisneros (with the approval of the Crown) gave mathematics a permanent position in the University of San Marcos. Mathematics was attached to the chair of cosmography. Doctor Juan Ramón Koening, a Belgian by birth, was named to the chair.. Viceroy Manuel de Guirior created two new chairs at the university.

Luis Enríquez de Guzmán, 9th Count of Alba de Liste founded the Naval Academy of the colony. Francisco Gil de Taboada supported the navigation school.  Teodoro de Croix began the Botanic Garden of Lima.

Francisco de Borja y Aragón also founded, in Cuzco, the Colegio del Príncipe for sons of the Indigenous nobility and the Colegio de San Francisco for sons of the conquistadors. Manuel de Amat y Juniet founded the Royal College of San Carlos.

The first books printed in Peru were produced by Antonio Ricardo, a printer from Turin who settled in Lima. Diego de Benavides y de la Cueva built the first theater in Lima. Manuel de Oms y de Santa Pau founded a literary academy in 1709 and promoted weekly literary discussions in the palace that attracted some of Lima's best writers. These included the famous Criollo scholar Pedro Peralta y Barnuevo and several Indigenous poets. Oms introduced French and Italian fashions in the viceroyalty. The Italian musician Rocco Cerruti (1688–1760) arrived in Peru. Francisco Gil de Taboada supported the foundation of the newspaper El Mercurio Peruano in 1791 and founded the Academy of Fine Arts.

Jesuit Barnabé de Cobo (1582–1657), who explored Mexico and Peru, brought the cinchona bark from Lima to Spain in 1632, and afterwards to Rome and other parts of Italy.

In 1671, Rose of Lima was canonized by Pope Clement X. Rose was the first native-born American to become a Catholic saint. Pope Benedict XIII elevated another two important Peruvian saints, Toribio Alfonso de Mogrovejo and Francisco de Solano.

Diego Quispe Tito was a famous artist before the age of Independence.

Science
In 1737 Jorge Juan y Santacilia and Antonio de Ulloa, Spanish scientists sent by the French Academy on a scientific mission to measure a degree of meridian arc at the equator, arrived in the colony. They also had the mission of reporting on disorganization and corruption in the government and smuggling. Their  report was published later, under the title Noticias Secretas de América (Secret News From America).

Manuel de Guirior assisted the scientific expedition of Hipólito Ruiz López, José Antonio Pavón and Joseph Dombey, sent to study the flora of the viceroyalty. The expedition lasted from 1777 to 1788. Their findings were later published as La flora peruana y chilena (The Flora of Peru and Chile). Again a major concern was stimulating the economy, which Guirior did by adopting liberal measures in agriculture, mining, commerce and industry.

Another French influence on science in the colony was Louis Godin, another member of the meridian expedition. He was appointed cosmógrafo mayor by Viceroy Mendoza.  The duties of cosmógrafo mayor included publishing almanacs and sailing instructions. Another French scientist in Peru at this time was Charles Marie de La Condamine.

The Balmis Expedition arrived in Lima on May 23, 1806. At the same time these viceroys adopted rigorous measures to suppress the thought of the Encyclopedists and revolutionaries in the United States and France.

See also 

 History of Peru
 Peruvian Viceroyal architecture
 Inca architecture
 Colonialism
 List of Viceroys of Peru
 Spanish conquest of the Muisca
 Spanish colonization of the Americas
 Spanish Empire
 Viceroyalty of New Spain
 Kuraka
 Criollo people

Notes

References

Further reading

Conquest

Cieza de León, Pedro de. The Discovery and Conquest of Peru: Chronicles of the New World Encounter. Ed. and trans., Alexandra Parma Cook and David Noble Cook. Durham: Duke University Press 1998.
Hemming, John. The Conquest of the Incas. New York: Harcourt Brace Janovich, 1970.
Lockhart, James. The men of Cajamarca; a social and biographical study of the first conquerors of Peru, Austin, Published for the Institute of Latin American Studies by the University of Texas Press [1972]
Yupanqui, Titu Cusi. An Inca Account of the Conquest of Peru. Trans. Ralph Bauer. Boulder: University Press of Colorado 2005.

Colonial

 Andrien, Kenneth J. Crisis and Decline: The Viceroyalty of Peru in the Seventeenth Century. Albuquerque: University of New Mexico Press 1985.
 Andrien, Kenneth. The Kingdom of Quito, 16990-1830: The State and Regional Development. New York: Cambridge University Press 1995.
 Andrien, Kenneth J. Andean Worlds: Indigenous History, Culture, and Consciousness under Spanish Rule, 1532-1825. Albuquerque: University of New Mexico Press 2001.
 Bakewell, Peter J. Silver and Entrepreneurship in Seventeenth-Century Potosí: The Life and times of Antonio López de Quiroga. Albuquerque: University of New Mexico Press 1988.
 Baker, Geoffrey. Imposing Harmony: Music and Society in Colonial Cuzco. Durham: Duke University Press 2008.
 Bowser, Frederick P. The African Slave in Colonial Peru, 1524-1650. Stanford: Stanford University Press 1973.
 Bradley, Peter T. Society, Economy, and Defence in Seventeenth-Century Peru: The Administration of the Count of Alba de Liste (1655-61). Liverpool: Institute of Latin American Studies, University of Liverpool 1992.
 Bradley, Peter T. The Lure of Peru: Maritime Intrusion into the South Sea, 1598-1701. New York: St Martin's Press 1989.
 Burns, Kathryn. Colonial Habits: Convents and the Spiritual Economy of Cuzco, Peru (1999), on the crucial role that convents played in the Andean economy as lenders and landlords; nuns exercised economic & spiritual power. 
Cahill, David. From Rebellion to Independence in the Andes: Soundings from Southern Peru, 1750-1830. Amsterdam: Aksant 2002.
Chambers, Sarah C. From Subjects to Citizens: Honor, Gender, and Politics in Arequipa, Peru, 1780-1854. University Park: Penn State Press 1999.
Charnay, Paul. Indian Society in the Valley of Lima, Peru, 1532-1824. Blue Ridge Summit: University Press of America 2001.
 Clayton, Lawrence A. Caulkers and Carpenters in a New World: The Shipyards of Colonial Guayaquil. Ohio University Press 1980.
 Dean, Carolyn. Inka Bodies and the Body of Christ: Corpus Christi in Colonial Cuzco, Peru. Durham: Duke University Press 1999.
 Fisher, John. Bourbon Peru, 1750-1824. Liverpool: Liverpool University Press 2003.
 Fisher, John R., Allan J. Kuethe, and Anthony McFarlane, eds. Reform and Insurrection in Bourbon New Granada and Peru. Baton Rouge: Louisiana State University Press 2003.
 Gauderman, Kimberly. Women's Lives in Colonial Quito: Gender, Law, and Economy in Spanish America. Austin: University of Texas Press 2003.
 Garrett, David T. Shadows of Empire: The Indian Nobility of Cusco, 1750-1825. New York: Cambridge University Press 2005.
 Griffiths, Nicholas. The Cross and the Serpent: Religious Repression and Resurgence in Colonial Peru. Norman: University of Oklahoma Press 1996.
 Hyland, Sabine. The Jesuit and the Incas: The Extraordinary Life of Padre Blas Valera, S.J. Ann Arbor: University of Michigan Press 2003.
 Jacobsen, Nils. Mirages of Transition: The Peruvian Altiplano, 1780-1930 (1996)
 Lamana, Gonzalo. Domination Without Dominance: Inca-Spanish Relations in Early Colonial Peru. Durham: Duke University Press 2008.
 Lane, Kris. Quito 1599: City and Colony in Transition. Albuquerque: University of New Mexico Press 2002.
 Lockhart, James. Spanish Peru, 1532-1560: A Social History (1968), a detailed portrait of the social and economic lives of the first generation of Spanish settlers in Peru & the development of Spanish colonial society in the generation after conquest
 Mangan, Jane E. Trading Roles: Gender, Ethnicity, and the Urban Economy in Colonial Potosí. Durham: Duke University Press 2005.
 Marks, Patricia. Deconstructing Legitimacy: Viceroys, Merchants, and the Military in Late Colonial Peru. University Park: Penn State Press 2007.
 Means, Philip Ainsworth. Fall of the Inca Empire and the Spanish Rule in Peru: 1530-1780 (1933)
 Miller, Robert Ryal, ed. Chronicle of Colonial Lima: The Diary of Joseph and Francisco Mugaburu, 1640-1697. Norman: University of Oklahoma Press 1975.
 Mills, Kenneth. Idolatry and Its Enemies: Colonial Andean Religion and Extirpation, 1640-1750. Princeton: Princeton University Press 1997.
 Milton, Cynthia E. The Many Meanings of Poverty: Colonialism, Social Compacts, and Assistance in Eighteenth-Century Ecuador. Stanford: Stanford University Press 2007.
 Minchom, Martin. The People of Quito, 1690-1810: Change and Unrest in the Underclass. Boulder: Westview Press 1994.
 Osorio, Alejandra B. Inventing Lima: Baroque Modernity in Peru's South Sea Metropolis. New York: Palgrave 2008.
 Phelan, John Leddy, The Kingdom of Quito in the Seventeenth-Century. Madison: University of Wisconsin Press 1967,
 Poma de Ayala, Felipe Guaman, The First New Chronicle and Good Government: On the History of the World and the Incas up to 1615. Ed. and trans. Roland Hamilton. Austin: University of Texas Press 2009.
 Premo, Bianca. Children of the Father King: Youth, Authority, and Legal Minority in Colonial Lima. Chapel Hill: University of North Carolina Press 2005.
 Ramírez, Susan Elizabeth. The World Turned Upside Down: Cross-Cultural Contact and Conflict in Sixteenth-Century Peru. Stanford: Stanford University Press 1996.
 Serulnikov, Sergio. Subverting Colonial Authority: Challenges to Spanish Rule in Eighteenth-Century Southern Andes. Durham: Duke University Press 2003.
 Spalding, Karen. Huarochirí: An Andean Society Under Inca and Spanish Rule. Stanford: Stanford University Press 1984.
 Stavig, Ward. The World of Tupac Amaru: Conflict, Community, and Identity in Colonial Peru (1999), an ethnohistory that examines the lives of Andean Indians, including diet, marriage customs, labor classifications, taxation, and the administration of justice, in the eighteenth century.
 Tandeter, Enrique. Coercion and Market: Silver Mining in Colonial Potosí, 1692-1826. Albuquerque: University of New Mexico Press 1993.
TePaske, John J., ed. and trans. Discourse and Political Reflections on the Kingdom of Peru by Jorge Juan and Antonio Ulloa. Norman: University of Oklahoma Press 1978.
Thomson, Sinclair. We Alone Will Rule: Native Andean Politics in the Age of Insurgency. Madison: University of Wisconsin Press 2003.
 Van Deusen, Nancy E. Between the Sacred and the Worldly: the Institutional and Cultural Practice of Recogimiento in Colonial Lima. Stanford: Stanford University Press 2001.
 Varón Gabai, Rafael. Francisco Pizarro and His Brothers: The Illusion of Power in Sixteenth-Century Peru. Trans. by Javier Flores Espinosa. Norman: University of Oklahoma Press 1997.
 Walker, Charles F. Shaky Colonialism: The 1746 Earthquake-Tsunami in Lima, Peru, and Its Long AftermathStay (2008)
 Wightman, Ann M. Indigenous Migration and Social Change: The Forasteros of Cuzco, 1570-1720. Durham: Duke University Press 1990.

External links 

Metropolitan Museum of Art Libraries.org: "The colonial Andes: tapestries and silverwork, 1530-1830" — exhibition catalog with info on the Viceroyalty of Peru (available online as PDF).

 
Peru
 
History of the Captaincy General of Chile
Colonial Colombia
Former colonies in South America
History of Peru
Spanish colonization of the Americas
16th century in Peru
17th century in Peru
18th century in Peru
1800s in Peru
1810s in Peru
1820s in Peru
States and territories established in 1542
States and territories disestablished in 1824
Titles of nobility in the Americas
1542 establishments in the Viceroyalty of Peru
1824 disestablishments in the Viceroyalty of Peru
Spanish-speaking countries and territories